Lukáš Kučera (born 18 April 2000) is a Slovak professional footballer recently played for Senica in the Fortuna liga.

He made his senior league debut for Senica on 13 May 2017 in their Fortuna Liga 3–2 away loss at Žilina.

He also appeared in the Slovakia under-16 national team.

References

External links 
 
 Lukáš Kučera profile on the FK Senica official website

2000 births
Living people
People from Myjava
Sportspeople from the Trenčín Region
Slovak footballers
Slovakia youth international footballers
Association football defenders
FK Senica players
Slovak Super Liga players